Richard Lewis Kimble (July 27, 1915 – May 7, 2001) was a shortstop in Major League Baseball. He played for the Washington Senators.

References

External links

1915 births
2001 deaths
Major League Baseball shortstops
Washington Senators (1901–1960) players
Baseball players from Ohio
People from Buchtel, Ohio